Neurophyseta durgalis is a moth in the family Crambidae. It was described by William Schaus in 1920. It is found in Guatemala.

The wingspan is about 15 mm. The forewings are white with a marginal brown line interrupted by veins.

References

Moths described in 1920
Musotiminae